Vasilyevka is a rural locality (a settlement) in Plyoso-Kuryinsky Selsoviet, Khabarsky District, Altai Krai, Russia. The population was 207 as of 2013. It was founded in 1910. There are 5 streets.

Geography 
Vasilyevka is located 38 km east of Khabary (the district's administrative centre) by road. Plyoso-Kurya is the nearest rural locality.

References 

Rural localities in Khabarsky District